The Kunal Patel San Francisco Open is a professional tennis tournament played on indoor hard courts. It is currently part of the ATP Challenger Tour. It is held annually in San Francisco, United States since 2017. The inaugural event was held February 2017, at the Bay Club SF Tennis Center, the West Coast's largest indoor tennis facility.

Past finals

Singles

Doubles

References

External links
Official Website

ATP Challenger Tour
Hard court tennis tournaments
Tennis tournaments in California
Sports competitions in San Francisco
2017 establishments in California
Recurring sporting events established in 2017